Sithon nedymond, the plush, is a butterfly in the family Lycaenidae. It was described by Hans Fruhstorfer in 1912. It is found in the Indomalayan realm.

Subspecies
Sithon nedymond nedymond (Sundaland)
Sithon nedymond ismarus Fruhstorfer, 1912 (southern Burma, Langkawi, Thailand)
Sithon nedymond mastanabal Fruhstorfer, 1912 (south-eastern Borneo)
Sithon nedymond klossi Riley, 1945 (Mentawai Island)

References

External links
Sithon at Markku Savela's Lepidoptera and Some Other Life Forms

Sithon
Butterflies described in 1912